Walcott Independent School District is a private school district in southwestern Deaf Smith County, Texas (USA).

The district has one school - Walcott Elementary - that serves students in grades pre-kindergarten through six. Secondary school students living in the district attend Hereford Junior High and Hereford High School.

The Walcott Elementary was named a National Blue Ribbon School in 2004 and 2018.

In 2009, the school district was rated "exemplary" by the Texas Education Agency.

References

External links
Walcott ISD - Official site.

School districts in Deaf Smith County, Texas